Pauline Toni Norris (born 1964) is a New Zealand academic, and as of 2019 is a full professor at the University of Otago.

Academic career

After a 1993 PhD titled  'The negotiation and re-negotiation of occupational control : a study of retail pharmacy in New Zealand, 1930-1990'  at Victoria University of Wellington, Norris  moved to the University of Otago, rising to full professor.

Selected works 
 Norris, Pauline, Andrew Herxheimer, Joel Lexchin, Peter Mansfield, and World Health Organization. Drug promotion: what we know, what we have yet to learn: Reviews of materials in the WHO/HAI database on drug promotion. No. WHO/EDM/PAR/2004.3. Geneva: World Health Organization, 2005.
 Watson, Margaret Camilla, P. Norris, and A. G. Granas. "A systematic review of the use of simulated patients and pharmacy practice research." International Journal of Pharmacy Practice 14, no. 2 (2006): 83–93.
 Norris, Pauline. "How ‘we’are different from ‘them’: occupational boundary maintenance in the treatment of musculo‐skeletal problems." Sociology of Health & Illness 23, no. 1 (2001): 24-43.
 Capstick, Stuart, Pauline Norris, Faafetai Sopoaga, and Wale Tobata. "Relationships between health and culture in Polynesia–A review." Social Science & Medicine 68, no. 7 (2009): 1341–1348.

References

External links
  
 

Living people
New Zealand women academics
Victoria University of Wellington alumni
Academic staff of the University of Otago
New Zealand medical researchers
1964 births